Andre de Lange (born February 29, 1984 in Johannesburg, Transvaal) is a South African cricketer who played for Free State cricket team and Boland cricket team before playing for Singapore national cricket team from 2013 to 2014. He is right-handed top-order batsman who can bowl gentle medium pace balls.

References

External links
  
 

1984 births
Living people
South African cricketers
Free State cricketers
Boland cricketers
People from Johannesburg
Singaporean cricketers